Dwell is a retailer of furniture in the United Kingdom. The company was originally established in 2002 as Dwell Retail Ltd., and opened its first store in London the following year. The company was acquired by British retail group DFS in August 2014.

History
Founded by Aamir Ahmad, Sean Galligan and Dave Garrett, Dwell began trading with a single store in Balham in 2003. It grew across London, with stores in Balham, Islington, Kingston, Richmond, Tottenham Court Road and Westfield.

In 2010, the company received £5m in funding from Key Capital Partners. The company announced plans to expand to 60 stores and 20 concessions across the UK within five years, and opened a flagship store on Tottenham Court Road. By the end of 2010 the company had 24 stores, including a concession in House of Fraser, and had locations across the UK, including Birmingham, Cardiff, Manchester and Glasgow.

In July 2013, the original founders formed a new company Coin Furniture Ltd (CFL).

In February 2014, Dwell entered into a marketing partnership with larger retailer, DFS. This led to Dwell's acquisition by DFS in August 2014.

Current
Headquartered at London Bridge and with distribution based in Milton Keynes, the company now has over 400 staff and 38 stores across the UK.

In February 2014, Dwell entered into a marketing partnership with larger retailer, DFS. This led to Dwell's acquisition by DFS in August 2014.

The original founders retired in 2019 and management was taken over by CEO Peter Jenkins.

References

External links
 

Furniture retailers of the United Kingdom
Retail companies based in London
Retail companies established in 2002
2002 establishments in England